St Columba's School is a 3–18 mixed private day school in Kilmacolm, Inverclyde, Scotland. It is split across two sites and is a member of the Headmasters' and Headmistresses' Conference.

The school provides both primary and secondary education between its Junior and Senior Schools.

In 2016, the School built a new building called the Girdwood Building which is home to Transitus, English, Guidance and Modern and Ancient Languages

History
St Columba's was founded in 1897 at Duchal Road where the red sandstone building is still located. The preparatory school at St Columba's was formerly located at Shieldhall on Bridge of Weir Road. Boarders were once accepted and accommodated in Shallott, the current junior school building. The junior school was then located at Shieldhall on the Bridge of Weir Road. During the Second World War, Shieldhall was used as dormitories for evacuees from other schools, particularly those also owned by the Girls' Schools Company. The Knockbuckle Road site, which now houses the Junior School, was once occupied by boarders. When boarding ceased in 1970 it was developed and has been the site of the Junior School ever since.

St Columba's first admitted boys around 1978, and became fully co-educational in 1982.

Sites 
The senior school is on Duchal Road to the north of Kilmacolm's village centre. The junior school and new sports facilities, including rugby pitches are located on Birkmyre Park, with the hockey ground being a 3G  artificial pitch.

Notable staff
Margaret Paulin Young, Founding Head 1897-1900 
Norah Neilson Gray taught art here, where she was nicknamed "Purple Patch".
Sandra McGruther, author of the Detective Lorimer novels, writing as Alex Gray was an English teacher here

Notable alumni

 Ruth M. Arthur, author
 Winifred Drinkwater, aviator and aeroplane engineer
 Mairi Hedderwick, illustrator and author
 Eleanor Laing, MP
 Helen M. Laird, leader within the Girl Guide movement
 Rona Morison, actress 
 Myrtle Simpson, skier

References

 The Times Independent School of the Year entry

External links 
 
 Profile on the Independent Schools Council website
 HMIE Inspection Reports

St Columba's School, Kilmacolm
Private schools in Inverclyde
Educational institutions established in 1897
1897 establishments in Scotland